Maxime Raymond (25 December 1883 – 13 July 1961) was a Canadian politician, businessman and lawyer in Quebec.

Raymond was born in Saint-Stanislas-de-Kostka, Quebec. In the 1925 Canadian federal election he ran as a Liberal candidate in the district of Beauharnois, and won.  He was re-elected in 1926 and 1930. In 1935 and 1940 he was elected in the district of Beauharnois—Laprairie. Raymond was one of three Liberal MPs who broke with the party to oppose Canada's entry into the Second World War in 1939, arguing that Canada should restrict its efforts to home defence and not send its troops abroad.

He formally left the Liberals over the issue of conscription and became the Leader of the Bloc populaire canadien on February 10, 1943. Raymond was re-elected in 1945 as a Bloc populaire MP but did not run for re-election in 1949.

Footnotes

1883 births
1961 deaths
Liberal Party of Canada MPs
Members of the House of Commons of Canada from Quebec
Bloc populaire canadien MPs
People from Montérégie